Mubritinib (TAK-165) is a protein kinase inhibitor which was under development by Takeda for the treatment of cancer. It completed phase I clinical trials but appears to have been discontinued, as no new information on the drug has surfaced since December 2008.

See also 
 Protein kinase inhibitor

References 

Tyrosine kinase inhibitors
Oxazoles
Triazoles
Trifluoromethyl compounds
Abandoned drugs